Greer is an unincorporated community in Knox County, in the U.S. state of Ohio.

History
A former variant name of Greer was Greersville. Greersville was laid out in 1836 by Robert Greer, and named for him. A post office called Greersville was established in 1851, the name was changed to Greer in 1908, and the post office closed in 1949.

References

Unincorporated communities in Knox County, Ohio
1836 establishments in Ohio
Populated places established in 1836
Unincorporated communities in Ohio